Antoculeora is a genus of moths of the family Noctuidae.

Species
 Antoculeora locuples Oberthür, 1880
 Antoculeora lushanensis Chou & Lu, 1978
 Antoculeora ornatissima Walker, 1858
 Antoculeora yoshimotoi Ronkay, 1997

References
 Antoculeora at Markku Savela's Lepidoptera and Some Other Life Forms
 Natural History Museum Lepidoptera genus database

Plusiinae